Building at 34 Choate Street is a historic home located at Newark in New Castle County, Delaware.  It was built in 1893 and is a two-story, gable roofed brick single family residence with original trim and front porch still intact.  It has a one-story, shed roofed frame rear wing.

It was added to the National Register of Historic Places in 1983.

References

Houses on the National Register of Historic Places in Delaware
Houses completed in 1893
Houses in Newark, Delaware
National Register of Historic Places in New Castle County, Delaware